The 1993 LSU Tigers baseball team represented Louisiana State University in the 1993 NCAA Division I baseball season. The Tigers played their home games at Alex Box Stadium. The team was coached by Skip Bertman in his 10th season at LSU.

The Tigers won the College World Series, defeating the Wichita State Shockers in the championship game.

Roster

Schedule

Awards and honors 
Adrian Antonini
 College World Series All-Tournament Team

Harry Berrios
 All-America Second Team
 All-SEC Second Team
 SEC Tournament Most Outstanding Player
 SEC Tournament All-Tournament Team

Jim Greely
 College World Series All-Tournament Team

Will Hunt
 SEC Tournament All-Tournament Team

Russ Johnson
 SEC Tournament All-Tournament Team

Brett Laxton
 College World Series All-Tournament Team
 All-America First Team
 National Freshman of the Year
 All-SEC First Team

Mike Neal
 SEC Tournament All-Tournament Team

Armando Rios
 College World Series All-Tournament Team

Mike Sirotka
 College World Series All-Tournament Team

Todd Walker
 College World Series Most Outstanding Player
 Golden Spikes Award Finalist
 All-America First Team
 SEC Player of the Year
 All-SEC First Team

Jason Williams
 SEC Tournament All-Tournament Team

Tigers in the 1993 MLB Draft 
The following members of the LSU Tigers baseball program were drafted in the 1993 Major League Baseball Draft.

References 

Lsu
LSU Tigers baseball seasons
NCAA Division I Baseball Championship seasons
College World Series seasons
Southeastern Conference baseball champion seasons
LSU
LSU